Pompee or variant thereof, may refer to:

 French ship Pompée (1791), a French Navy Téméraire-class ship-of-the-line
 , a UK Royal Navy Pompée-class ship-of-the-line
 La Mort de Pompée, 17th century French play by Pierre Corneille
 Pompée-class ship of the line, a class of warship for the UK Royal Navy
 Pompée Valentin Vastey, a Haitian writer
 Pompey, Roman triumvir

See also 

 Pompeii (disambiguation)
 Pompey (disambiguation)